In mathematics, the annulus theorem (formerly called the annulus conjecture) states roughly that the region between two well-behaved spheres is an annulus. It is closely related to the stable homeomorphism conjecture (now proved) which states that every orientation-preserving homeomorphism of Euclidean space is stable.

Statement
If S and T are topological spheres in Euclidean space, with S contained in T, then it is not true in general that the region between them is an annulus,  because of the existence of wild spheres in dimension at least 3. So the annulus theorem has to be stated to exclude these examples, by adding some condition to ensure that S and T are well behaved. There are several ways to do this.

The annulus theorem states that if any homeomorphism h of Rn to itself maps the unit ball B into its interior, then B − h(interior(B)) is homeomorphic to the annulus Sn−1×[0,1].

History of proof
The annulus theorem is trivial in dimensions 0 and 1.

Torus trick 
Robion Kirby's torus trick is a proof method employing an immersion of a punctured torus  into , where then smooth structures can be pulled back along the immersion and be lifted to covers.
The torus trick is used in Kirby's proof of the annulus theorem in dimensions .
It was also employed in further investigations of topological manifolds with Laurent C. Siebenmann

Here is a list of some further applications of the torus trick that appeared in the literature:

 Proving existence and uniqueness (up to isotopy) of smooth structures on surfaces
 Proving existence and uniqueness (up to isotopy) of PL structures on 3-manifolds

The stable homeomorphism conjecture

A homeomorphism of Rn is called stable if it is a product of homeomorphisms each of which is the identity on some non-empty open set. 
The stable homeomorphism conjecture states that every orientation-preserving homeomorphism of Rn is stable.  previously showed that the  stable homeomorphism conjecture is equivalent to the annulus conjecture, so it is true.

References

Further reading 
MathOverflow discussion on the Torus trick
Video recording of interview with Robion Kirby
Topological Manifolds Seminar (University of Bonn, 2021)

Geometric topology
Theorems in topology